N. T. Shanmugam is an Indian politician and former Minister of State for Food Processing Industries. He was elected to the Lok Sabha from Vellore constituency as a Pattali Makkal Katchi candidate in 1998 and 1999 elections.

References 

Pattali Makkal Katchi politicians
Union Ministers from Tamil Nadu
Living people
India MPs 1998–1999
India MPs 1999–2004
Lok Sabha members from Tamil Nadu
People from Vellore
Year of birth missing (living people)